The 2019 China Open was held from December 13 to 17 in Tianjin, China. It was the third edition of the event. The winning team on both sides received 40,000 of the total 500,000 (CNY). The event was held at the Beijing National Aquatics Centre in preparation for the 2022 Winter Olympics in which the venue hosted the curling events.

On the men's side, the Korean team of Kim Chang-min, Lee Ki-jeong, Kim Hak-kyun and Lee Ki-bok scored one in an extra end to defeat the United States' Korey Dropkin 7–6 in the final. Team Kim qualified through the round robin as the top seeded team with a 6–1 record, only suffering defeat once to Canada's Braden Calvert rink. Team Calvert, along with the United States' Dropkin and the host China's Zou Qiang also qualified for the playoff round. In the semifinal, the Korean team took an early five point lead on China's Zou and hung on for the 6–3 win. In the other Team Dropkin defeated the Calvert rink by the same score. In the final, Team Kim took an early lead at the halfway point but a steal of two by Dropkin in the sixth gave them their first lead of the game. After getting two in the seventh and then forcing the US team to a single in the eighth, the Korean team got one in the extra end to win the match. Team Kim became the second team to win the China Open following the Kim Ji-sun rink who won the women's event in 2013 China Open. Canada's Team Calvert won the bronze medal by a score of 9–4 over Team Zou. The eight team field was rounded out by the defending champions Russia's Sergey Glukhov, the Netherlands Jaap van Dorp, Sweden's Fredrik Nyman and Switzerland's Andrin Schnider.

On the women's side, Russia's Alina Kovaleva rink repeated as champions for the second year in a row, defeating Canda's Corryn Brown rink 4–3 in a tight championship game. Like in 2018, Team Kovaleva, with Kovaleva, Maria Komarova, Galina Arsenkina and Ekaterina Kuzmina finished first in the round robin, this time with a 6–1 record. Their sole defeat came to Korea's Kim Eun-jung, who also qualified for the playoffs with a 5–2 record. Canada's Brown rink along with Switzerland's Irene Schori both also finished 5–2 to qualify for the playoffs. In the semifinal, Team Kovaleva avenged their sole loss by defeating Team Kim 5–3, while Team Brown stole singles in ends seven and eight to steal a 5–4 victory against Team Schori. In the final, the game remained close all the way through, with Team Kovaleva scoring a single in the final end to secure the title for a second year in a row. Team Schori took third place with a 7–4 win over Team Kim. Germany's Daniela Jentsch, host China's Han Yu, the United States' Madison Bear and Japan's Asuka Kanai rounded out the women's field.

Men

Teams

The teams are listed as follows:

Round-robin standings
Final round-robin standings

Round-robin results 
All draw times are listed in China Standard Time (UTC+08:00).

Draw 1
Friday, December 13, 6:30 pm

Draw 2
Saturday, December 14, 11:00 am

Draw 3
Saturday, December 14, 7:00 pm

Draw 4
Sunday, December 15, 11:00 am

Draw 5
Sunday, December 15, 7:00 pm

Draw 6
Monday, December 16, 11:00 am

Draw 7
Monday, December 16, 7:00 pm

Playoffs

Source:

Semifinals
Tuesday, December 17, 8:30 am

Bronze medal game
Tuesday, December 17, 1:00 pm

Final
Tuesday, December 17, 1:00 pm

Women

Teams

The teams are listed as follows:

Round-robin standings
Final round-robin standings

Round-robin results 
All draw times are listed in China Standard Time (UTC+08:00).

Draw 1
Friday, December 13, 2:45 pm

Draw 2
Saturday, December 14, 7:00 am

Draw 3
Saturday, December 14, 3:00 pm

Draw 4
Sunday, December 15, 7:00 am

Draw 5
Sunday, December 15, 3:00 pm

Draw 6
Monday, December 16, 7:00 am

Draw 7
Monday, December 16, 3:00 pm

Playoffs

Source:

Semifinals
Tuesday, December 17, 8:30 am

Bronze medal game
Tuesday, December 17, 1:00 pm

Final
Tuesday, December 17, 1:00 pm

References

External links
Men's Event
Women's Event

2019 in curling
December 2019 sports events in China
International curling competitions hosted by China
Sports competitions in Tianjin